For the podcast Vince Russo's The Brand for The RELM Network see Vince Russo

The Brand is a silent film released in the U.S. in 1914. Jere F. Looney wrote the story for the film and Kenean Buel directed. It was a Kalem film in two parts. The story features a girl sent to a reformatory by her step-mother and a girl from the slums.

Cast
Alice Joyce as Mary
Tom Moore
Henry Hallam
Helen Lindroth 
John E. Mackin 
Alice Hollister 
Mary Ross
Doris Hollister

Reception 
The film received reviews from publications including New York Dramatic Mirror and Moving Picture World.

References

American silent short films
American black-and-white films
1914 films
1910s American films